Dennis Lister is a Bermudian politician who is serving as Speaker of House of Assembly of Bermuda. He is the longest serving member of parliament of Progressive Labour Party.

References 

Progressive Labour Party (Bermuda) politicians

Year of birth missing (living people)
Living people